Maardu is a village in Jõelähtme Parish, Harju County in northern Estonia. It's located southeast of the town of Maardu, just behind the Lake Maardu. Maardu has a population of 123 (as of 1 January 2010).

Maardu Manor is located in the village.

Maardu village was first mentioned in 1241 (Martækilæ) and the manor in 1397.

Actor Evald Hermaküla (1941–2000) was born in Maardu village.

Gallery

References

External links
Maardu Manor
Maardu Manor at Estonian Manors Portal

Villages in Harju County
Kreis Harrien